Glad All Over is the sixth studio album for Californian alternative rock band The Wallflowers. It was released in October 2012 by Columbia Records, and charted at #48.

The band revealed the title of the album on July 12, 2012, and they released their first single, "Reboot the Mission" for free on July 24, 2012.

On October 1, 2012, it was announced on the band's website that "Love Is a Country" would be the second single.

Reception
The album received a score of 73 out of 100 from Metacritic, indicating generally positive reviews. In a positive review, AllMusic wrote that "The Wallflowers don't abandon their identity as rock & roll classicists, they just now feel the freedom to mess around, and they've come up with one of their loosest, liveliest records that not-so-coincidentally is one of their best." 

Nine years after the release of the record, Jakob Dylan told Uproxx that "it was a contentious record to make" and that tensions within the band led to it being a "disjointed" album. "Simply put, I don’t think the band was getting together that great when we got back together. So, you can hear it in the record," he said.

Track listing

Personnel
The Wallflowers
Jakob Dylan – lead vocals, rhythm guitar
Jack Irons – drums, percussion
Rami Jaffee – keyboards
Stuart Mathis – lead guitar, backing vocals
Greg Richling – bass guitar, backing vocals, percussion

Additional musician
Mick Jones – guitar, backing vocals on "Misfits and Lovers" and "Reboot the Mission"
Jay Joyce – guitar, backing vocals, percussion, production

References

2012 albums
Albums produced by Jay Joyce
Columbia Records albums
The Wallflowers albums